September 27 - Eastern Orthodox liturgical calendar - September 29

All fixed commemorations below celebrated on October 11 by Orthodox Churches on the Old Calendar.{{#tag:ref|The notation Old Style or (OS) is sometimes used to indicate a date in the Julian Calendar (which is used by churches on the "Old Calendar").The notation New Style or (NS), indicates a date in the Revised Julian calendar (which is used by churches on the "New Calendar").|group=note}}

For September 28th, Orthodox Churches on the Old Calendar commemorate the Saints listed on September 15.

Saints
 Prophet Baruch (6th century BC) Συναξαριστής. 28 Σεπτεμβρίου. ECCLESIA.GR. (H ΕΚΚΛΗΣΙΑ ΤΗΣ ΕΛΛΑΔΟΣ).Prophet Baruch. OCA - Lives of the Saints.
 Martyrs Eustathios of Rome and Callinicus, by the sword.
 Venerable Chariton the Confessor, Abbot, of Palestine (350)Venerable Chariton the Confessor the Abbot of Palestine. OCA - Lives of the Saints.
 Martyrs Alexander, Alphius and Zosimas, brothers, Mark the Shepherd, Nicon, Neon, Heliodorus, and 24 others, in Pisidia and Phrygia (4th century)<ref>Martyr Alexander and 30 others in Pisidia and Phrygia. OCA - Lives of the Saints.</ref>
 Saint Alkison, Bishop of Nicopolis (Preveza) in Epirus (561) 
 Martyr Wenceslas (Vyacheslav) I of Bohemia, Prince of the Czechs (935)

Pre-Schism Western saints
 Saint Paternus, Born in Bilbao in Spain, he was one of the earliest Bishops of Auch in France (2nd century)
 Saint Privatus, a citizen of Rome scourged to death under Alexander Severus (223)
 Martyr Stacteus, in Rome.
 Martyrs Martial, Laurence and Companions, A group of twenty-two martyrs in North Africa.
 Saint Exuperius (Exupère, Soupire), Bishop of Toulouse, Confessor (411)
 Saint Eustochium, Abbess of a convent in Bethlehem, an early Desert Mother (419)
 Saint Silvinus, Bishop of Brescia in Italy (444)
 Saint Faustus of Riez, Bishop of Riez (495)
 Saint Machan, disciple of St. Cadoc. 
 Saint Conwall (Conval), born in Ireland, he was a disciple of St Kentigern and preached in Scotland (c. 630) 
 Hieromartyr Annemund (Chamond), Archbishop of Lyons in France, he was murdered in Châlon-sur-Saône by the tyrant Ebroin (657) 
 Saints Willigod and Martin, monks at Moyenmoutier in France who founded the monastery of Romont (c. 690) 
 Saint Tetta, Abbess of Wimborne in Dorset, who sent nuns from her 500-strong convent to St Boniface (c. 772)
 Saint Lioba, Abbess of Tauberbischofsheim, English missionary to Germany (c. 781)

Post-Schism Orthodox saints
 Venerable Auxentius the Alaman, ascetic and Wonderworker, leader of the "300 Allemagne Saints" of Cyprus (12th century)
 Saints Cyril, Schemamonk, and Maria, Schemanun, parents of St. Sergius of Radonezh (c. 1337)
 Venerable Chariton, Abbot of Syandema Monastery, Vologda (1509)
 Venerable Herodion, founder of Iloezersk Monastery, Belozersk (1541)

New martyrs and confessors
 New Martyr Anna Lykoshin, at Solovki Monastery (1925)
 New Hieromartyr Hilarion (Gromov), Hieromonk, of Petushki, Vladimir (1937)
 Virgin-martyr Michaela (Ivanova), Schemanun, of Aksinyino, Moscow (1937)
 Virgin-martyr Tatiana Chekmazovoy (1942)

Other commemorations
 Uncovering of the relics of St. Neophytus the Recluse, of Cyprus (1214)
 Synaxis of the Holy Fathers of Kiev whose relics lie in the Near Caves of St. Anthony.

Icon gallery

Notes

References

Sources
 September 28/October 11. Orthodox Calendar (PRAVOSLAVIE.RU).
 October 11 / September 28. HOLY TRINITY RUSSIAN ORTHODOX CHURCH (A parish of the Patriarchate of Moscow).
 September 28. OCA - The Lives of the Saints.
 The Autonomous Orthodox Metropolia of Western Europe and the Americas (ROCOR). St. Hilarion Calendar of Saints for the year of our Lord 2004. St. Hilarion Press (Austin, TX). p. 72.
 The Twenty-Eighth Day of the Month of September. Orthodoxy in China.
 September 28. Latin Saints of the Orthodox Patriarchate of Rome.
 The Roman Martyrology. Transl. by the Archbishop of Baltimore. Last Edition, According to the Copy Printed at Rome in 1914. Revised Edition, with the Imprimatur of His Eminence Cardinal Gibbons. Baltimore: John Murphy Company, 1916. pp. 299–300.
 Rev. Richard Stanton. A Menology of England and Wales, or, Brief Memorials of the Ancient British and English Saints Arranged According to the Calendar, Together with the Martyrs of the 16th and 17th Centuries. London: Burns & Oates, 1892. pp. 460–462.

 Greek Sources
 Great Synaxaristes:  28 ΣΕΠΤΕΜΒΡΙΟΥ. ΜΕΓΑΣ ΣΥΝΑΞΑΡΙΣΤΗΣ.
  Συναξαριστής. 28 Σεπτεμβρίου. ECCLESIA.GR. (H ΕΚΚΛΗΣΙΑ ΤΗΣ ΕΛΛΑΔΟΣ).
  28/09/2016. Ορθόδοξος Συναξαριστής.

 Russian Sources
  11 октября (28 сентября). Православная Энциклопедия под редакцией Патриарха Московского и всея Руси Кирилла (электронная версия). (Orthodox Encyclopedia - Pravenc.ru).
  28 сентября по старому стилю / 11 октября по новому стилю. Русская Православная Церковь - Православный церковный календарь на 2016 год.

September in the Eastern Orthodox calendar